Dianthus graniticus is a species of pink in the carnation family. It's a herbaceous perennial plant belonging to the family Caryophyllaceae natively occurring in central France.

References

graniticus
Flora of France